St. Mark's Lutheran Church is a historic Lutheran church on Main Street in Guilderland Center, Albany County, New York. It was built in 1872 in a vernacular Italianate style.  It has curved arched windows and a bracketed cornice. It features a square bell tower with pedimented cornice and steeple. St. Mark's served the Lutherans until 1973, when the town leased it as a community center.

It was listed on the National Register of Historic Places in 1982.

See also
National Register of Historic Places listings in Albany County, New York

References

External links

Lutheran churches in New York (state)
Churches on the National Register of Historic Places in New York (state)
Italianate architecture in New York (state)
Churches completed in 1872
19th-century Lutheran churches in the United States
Churches in Albany County, New York
Former churches in New York (state)
National Register of Historic Places in Albany County, New York
Italianate church buildings in the United States